Knockshegowna GAA is a Gaelic Athletic Association club in Ballingarry, County Tipperary, Ireland. The club's name comes from the townland of Knockshegowna to the east of Ballingarry. The club are part of the North Tipperary GAA division. The club have been North Tipperary Junior Hurling Champions on nine occasions.

Achievements
  Tipperary Junior A Hurling Championship Winners (3)1969, 1993, 2006
 North Tipperary Intermediate Hurling Championship Winners (2)1960, 1961
 North Tipperary Junior Hurling Championship Winners (11) 1934, 1957, 1969, 1972, 1974, 1988, 1989, 1993, 2006, 2013, 2015
  Munster Junior Club Hurling Championship Runners-Up 2005, 2006
 North Tipperary Junior B Football Championship Winners (2) 2003, 2007
 Tipperary Under-21 A Hurling Championship Winners (1) 1966 (with Lorrha)
 North Tipperary Under-21 A Hurling Championship Winners (2) 1965 (with Lorrha), 1966 (with Lorrha)

References

External links 
Official Site
Tipperary GAA site

Gaelic games clubs in County Tipperary